Pouteria villamilii (also called white nato) is a species of plant in the family Sapotaceae. It is endemic to the Philippines.  It is threatened by habitat loss.

References

Flora of the Philippines
villamilii
Vulnerable plants
Taxonomy articles created by Polbot
Taxobox binomials not recognized by IUCN